The Central Industrial Security Force (CISF) is a federal police organisation in India under the Ministry of Home Affairs. It is one among the Central Armed Police Forces (CAPF). CISF provides security to over 356 industrial units (including 13 Private Sector Units), government infrastructure projects and facilities and establishments located all over India. These include atomic power plants, space installations, mines, oil fields and refineries, major ports, heavy engineering, steel plants, barrages, fertiliser units, airports and hydroelectric/thermal power plants owned and controlled by Central Public Sector Undertakings (PSUs), and currency note presses.

It was set up under an Act of the Parliament of India on 15 March 1969 with a strength of 2,800. CISF was subsequently made an armed force of India by another Act of Parliament passed on 15 June 1983. Its current active strength is 148,371 personnel. In April 2017, the government raised the sanctioned strength from 145,000 to 180,000 personnel. Among its duties are guarding sensitive governmental buildings, the Delhi Metro, and providing airport security. The CISF is governed by the Union Ministry of Home Affairs, and its headquarters are at New Delhi.

CISF also provides consultancy services to private industries as well as other organisations within the Indian government. The scope of CISF's consulting practice includes security consulting and fire protection consulting.

It also plays a major role in Disaster Management. The CISF has a 'Fire Wing' which helps during fire accidents in Industries where the CISF is on guard.

History

It was set up under an act of Parliament on 10 March 1969 with a strength of around 2,800 personnel and as the name suggests, it was created for the better protection and security of industrial undertakings in the country. There was a limitation though, that industries to be provided protection should be wholly owned by the central government, which has since been modified so that the industries can now be a joint venture with the central government. However, the role of CISF has undergone diversification and it now also protects airports, seaports, metro rail networks, government buildings, heritage monuments (including the Taj Mahal and Red Fort), opium and alkaloids extractions, nuclear power plants, and space installations. It also specialises in VIP security as well as disaster management.
At present CISF undertakes duties concerning internal security, elections, anti Naxal operations and every other duty that the Government of India gives them.

Structure and organisation

The CISF is headed by an Indian Police Service officer with the rank of Director-General, assisted by an IPS officer in the rank of Addl. Director-General. The force is divided into Nine Sectors (Airport, North, North-East, East, West, South, Training, South-East, Central) and also has a Fire Service Wing.

The Airport Sector is commanded by an IPS officer in the rank of Addl. Director-General, assisted by an Inspector-General. The Airport Sector is divided into a number of Field Formation Units, one for each airport. Units at major international airports are commanded by a Deputy Inspector-General or Commandant; units at smaller airports by a Deputy or Assistant Commandant. The other six Sectors are each commanded by an Inspector-General, who is assisted by a Deputy Inspector-General.

The seven regional Sectors are divided into Zones, each commanded by a Deputy Inspector-General. Within each Zone are a number of Units, each under the command of a Commandant, or a DIG for certain major Units. A Deputy Commandant serves as the second-in-command of most units, or as the head of a smaller unit.  Within the Training Sector, the National Industrial Security Academy (NISA) is headed by an Inspector-General; the Fire Service Training Institute (FSTI) and six other recruit training centres are headed by Deputy Inspectors General.

The Financial Adviser of the CISF has been an Indian Revenue Service officer of the rank of Director and also has Dy Advisers from the Indian Audit and Accounts Service and Indian Civil Account Service.

Rank structure (gazetted officers)

Being a central Indian police agency and having high presence of Indian Police Service officers, CISF follows ranks and insignia similar to other police organisations in India. Non-gazetted (enrolled) officers and members use the same ranks as other Indian police forces.

Officers

Enlisted ranks

CISF protection to Non-Nationalised Industry/ Corporate sector

The Indian Parliament on 25 February 2009, authorised the provision of Central Industrial Security Force security to private and cooperative establishments across the country for a fee with the passage of the CISF (Amendment) Bill, 2008.

The Bill, which was passed by Rajya Sabha on 19 February and Lok Sabha on 25 February 2009, also provides for deployment of CISF to protect Indian missions abroad and its participation in the UN peacekeeping operations.

CISF started providing security to the Infosys Bangalore and Pune campus on 31 July 2009. The Infosys Mysore, the Reliance Jamnagar Refinery and the Delhi Metro Airport Express Line are the latest additions to the list of private sector establishments to be placed under CISF cover. Manish Kumar Rai, Assistant Commandant, led the first contingent of CISF deployed at Infosys Bangalore.

CISF has also started providing security to the Infosys Pune campus from 21 April 2011.

Universities Security
Vice-Chancellor of Visva-Bharati University in Santiniketan has asked the Central Government to permanently deploy Central Industrial Security Force (CISF) personnel on its campus.

On November 13, Union Home Ministry has accorded its approval for deployment of the CISF at the Visva-Bharati University in West Bengal also said that CISF will soon constitute a 'board of officers' who will conduct a security audit of the facility at Santiniketan.

Airport security 

The CISF is in charge of airport security at all commercial airports in India. Airport security, in the past, was under the control of airport police (under the relevant state government). However, following the hijacking of Indian Airlines Flight 814 in 1999, the topic of handing over security of the airports to the CISF was first proposed. While this proposal lay low for the next two years, the central government decided to respond to the security threat faced by all major nations of the world after the 2001 terrorist attacks happened in the United States (11 September 2001) and decided to adopt the suggestion. The Jaipur Airport was the first airport that came under the CISF's control on 3 February 2000. Following this, the majority of the commercial airports in India were brought under its purview. As of now CISF is protecting a total of 64 international and domestic airports in the country.

Security for Delhi Metro 
Security on the Delhi Metro is handled by the CISF Unit Delhi Metro Rail Corporation of CISF, who have been guarding the system ever since they took over from the Delhi Police in 2007. Closed-circuit cameras are used to monitor trains and stations, and feed from these is monitored by both the CISF and Delhi Metro authorities at their respective control rooms. Over 3500 CISF personnel have been deployed to deal with law and order issues in the system, in addition to metal detectors, x-ray baggage inspection systems and dog squads which are used to secure the system. Intercoms are provided in each train car for emergency communication between the passengers and the driver. Periodic security drills are carried out at stations and on trains to ensure preparedness of security agencies in emergency situations.

Fire Wing 

Besides providing protection, safety, and security to Industrial undertaking/installations, CISF also offers protection against Fire hazards. CISF has a highly specialised, trained and fully equipped fire wing. The first fire wing unit with a strength of 53 personnel was Inducted in FACT Cochin. As on date, the fire wing has been inducted in 91 units. The present strength of the Fire Wing is 6769 personnel.

The Fire wing which is an integral part of Central Industrial Security Force is the largest, well trained and equipped, fire fighting force in the Government Sector. It is known as an outstanding fire fighting force having an enviable record. It is providing fire coverage to Establishments varying from power plants, Refineries, Petro-Chemicals, fertilizers, Steel Plants Surface Transport, Heavy Industries, Space Application Center etc.  Fire wing Induction in the Undertaking is not limited to providing manpower to fight fire alone. It also ensures availability of proper and adequate devices for fire prevention and fire fighting along with the fire fighting staff.

Special Security Group

In 2006, Central Industrial Security Force (CISF), on the basis of recommendations of the Intelligence Bureau, raised a special unit called Special Security Group (SSG) to provide security cover to people nominated by the Home Ministry.  It came into existence on 17 November 2006. This unit is responsible for providing physical protection, evacuation, mobile and static security cover to persons who have been nominated by the Home Ministry.  For a person to be eligible for security cover by CISF special unit, the intelligence bureau and other secret police agencies are required to specify the danger after a detailed  'threat analysis',  which are often fudged for political and other considerations. In addition to CISF the Government also utilizes the National Security Guard (NSG), CRPF, BSF,  and ITBP for personal security cover.

Women in CISF
Initially the recruitment and posting of Personnel to the CISF was restricted to men. In the year 1992, Mrs. Asha Sinha earned the distinction of being the First Woman Commandant of a Central Armed Police Forces in India when she was posted as Commandant, Mazagon Dock Shipbuilders Limited. Earlier the role of Women was allowed but limited to supervisory roles in the Central Armed Police Forces which includes the CISF. The Parliamentary Committees of India for women's empowerment recommended greater roles for women in the CAPF including CISF. On these recommendations the Ministry of Home Affairs (India) declared reservation for women in constabulary in paramilitary forces, and later declared that they can also be inducted as officers in combat roles in all five Central Armed Police Forces.
The Union Home Minister announced that women's representation in the CRPF and CISF would be made 15 per cent. On 5 January 2016, it was decided that 33 per cent posts at the constabulary level would be reserved for women in the CRPF and the CISF in a phased manner. The CISF is increasing the engagement of women at positions where there is greater Civilian-Police Interaction, specially in the Airports and the Metro Stations.

Overseas Deployment

A contingent of the CISF was deployed at United Nations Stabilizations Mission in Haiti (MINUSTAH) / United Nations Mission for Justice Support in Haiti (MINUJUSTH) since
17th August 2008. It was repatriated to India on 31st December 2018.

Dog Squad
In 2021, The DIG of CISF said that the dog squad was 'an important component of the force'. The dogs are trained to sniff and identify IEDs and narcotics. While working with the bomb disposal squad they screen the bags left unattended. As of 2021, the CISF team in charge of Chennai Airport security has a dog squad of 9 dogs.

See also
 Ministry of Home Affairs
 Border Security Force
 Indo-Tibetan Border Police
 Central Reserve Police Force
 Sashastra Seema Bal
 Security categories in India
 Assam Rifles
 National Security Guard
 Border outpost

References

External links 

 
 Description on globalsecurity.org

 
1969 establishments in Delhi
Government agencies established in 1969
Federal law enforcement agencies of India
Specialist law enforcement agencies of India